Aquazone may refer to:

 Aquazone (theme park), an indoor waterpark in Blanchardstown, Ireland
 Lego Aquazone, a theme for the LEGO building block toy
 Aquazone (software), a series of fishtank simulation video games developed by Smith Micro
 The unrelated Aquazone: Desktop Life series of fishtank simulation video games developed by 9003.inc